Abikusno Tjokrosujoso (also spelled Abikoesno Tjokrosoejoso, or Abikusno Cokrosuyoso; 1897–1968) was one of the Founding Fathers of Indonesian Independence and a signatory to the constitution. During the Japanese occupation of the Dutch East Indies, Tjokrosoejoso was a key figure in Masjumi, and was a member of the Central Advisory Council..  He later served on the "Committee of Nine” (Panitia Sembilan) that drafted the preamble (known as the Jakarta Charter) to Indonesia's 1945 constitution. After independence, he served as the Minister of Transportation in Sukarno's first Presidential Cabinet, and also became an advisor to the Bureau of Public Works.[1]

Tjokrosujono was the younger brother of Oemar Tjokroaminoto, the first leader of Sarekat Islam. After the death of his brother on December 17, 1934, Abikusno inherited the post of leader of the Indonesian Islamic States Party (PSII). Along with Hoesni Thamrin, and Amir Sjarifoeddin, Tjokrosujoso formed the Indonesian National Political Assembly (GAPI), a united front consisting of all political parties, groups, and social organizations advocating the country's independence. The GAPI offered the Dutch colonial authorities full support in their defense against the Japanese if they were granted the right to establish a parliament under the rule of the Queen of the Netherlands. The Dutch refused the offer.

References

1897 births
1968 deaths
Indonesian collaborators with Imperial Japan
Members of the Central Advisory Council
Transport ministers of Indonesia
Tjokroaminoto family